Cape Peary is a headland in the Avannaata municipality, NW Greenland.

History 
This cape was named after US Arctic explorer Robert Peary (1856 - 1920).

Geography

See also
North Star Bay

References

Peary